Men's water polo at the 2017 Summer Universiade was held in Taipei, Taiwan, from 18 to 30 August 2017.

Squads

Results 
All times are Taiwan Standard Time (UTC+08:00)

Preliminary round

Group A

Group B

Group C

Group D

Final round

Bracket

5–8th place bracket

9–16th place bracket

Round of 16

9th–16th place quarterfinals

Quarterfinals

13th–16th place semifinals

9th–12th place semifinals

5th–8th semifinals

Semifinals

15th place match

13th place match

11th place match

9th place match

7th place match

5th place match

Third place match

Final

Final standing

References

External links
2017 Summer Universiade – Water polo – Men's tournament

Men